"Recitatif" is Toni Morrison's first published short story. It was initially published in 1983 in Confirmation: An Anthology of African American Women, an anthology edited by Amiri Baraka and Amina Baraka, and is the only short story written by the acclaimed novelist. A reissue of the story as a book, introduced by Zadie Smith, was published February 2022.

About
 is the French form of recitative, a style of musical declamation that hovers between song and ordinary speech, particularly used for dialogic and narrative interludes during operas and oratories. An obsolete sense of the term was also "the tone or rhythm peculiar to any language." Both of these definitions suggest the story's episodic nature, how each of the story's five sections happens in a register that is different from the respective ordinary lives of its two central characters, Roberta and Twyla. The story's vignettes bring together the rhythms of two lives for five, short moments, all of them narrated in Twyla's voice. The story is, then, in several ways, Twyla's "recitatif."

"Recitatif" is a story in racial writing, as the race of Twyla and Roberta are debatable. Though the characters are clearly separated by class, neither is affirmed as African-American or White. Morrison has described the story as "the removal of all racial codes from a narrative about two characters of different races for whom racial identity is crucial".

Plot summary

First encounter
Twyla and Roberta first meet within the confines of an orphanage for children, St. Bonny's (named after St. Bonaventure), because each has been taken away from her mother. Roberta's mother is ill; Twyla's mother "just likes to dance all night." We learn immediately that the girls look different from one another: one is black, one is white, although we are not told which is which. Despite their initially hostile feelings, they are drawn together because of their similar circumstances.

The two girls turn out to be "more alike than unalike." They were both "dumped" there. They become allies against the "big girls on the second floor" (whom they call "gar-girls", a name they get from mishearing the word "gargoyle"), as well as against the home's "real orphans", the children whose parents have died. They share a fascination with Maggie, the old, sandy-colored woman "with legs like parentheses" who works in the home's kitchen and is unable to speak.

Twyla and Roberta are reminded of their differences on the Sunday that each of their mothers comes to visit and attend church with them. Twyla's mother Mary is dressed inappropriately; Roberta's mother, wearing an enormous cross on her even more enormous chest. Mary offers her hand, but Roberta's mother refuses to shake Mary's hand and Mary begins cursing. Twyla experiences twin humiliations: her mother's inappropriate behavior shames her, and she feels slighted by Roberta's mother's refusal.

After four months together, Roberta leaves the orphanage.

Second encounter
Twyla and Roberta meet again eight years later during the late 1960s, when Twyla is "working behind the counter at the Howard Johnson's on the Thruway" and Roberta is sitting in a booth with "two guys smothered in head and facial hair." Roberta and her friends are on their way to the west coast to keep an appointment with Jimi Hendrix. The episode is brief but long enough for the two to show resentment towards each other. Roberta seems dismissive of Twyla and Twyla feels slighted for being told off by Roberta.

Third encounter
The third time Twyla and Roberta meet is 12 years after the second encounter. They are both married and meet while shopping at the Food Emporium, a new gourmet grocery store. Twyla describes the encounter as a complete opposite of their last. They get along well and share memories of the past. Roberta is rich and Twyla is lower middle class. Twyla is married to a firefighter and they have a son; Roberta is married to an IBM executive, a widower with four children who has a blue limousine and two servants. Twyla learns that Roberta returned to the orphanage two more times and then she ran away. She also finds out that she might have some suppressed memories about what really happened in the orphanage. She finds it hard to reconcile that her recollections may have been different from what actually transpired in reality.

Fourth encounter
The next time the two women meet, "racial strife" threatens Twyla's town of Newburgh, NY, in the form of busing. As she drives by the school, Twyla sees Roberta there, picketing the forced integration. Twyla is briefly threatened by the other protesters; Roberta doesn't come to her aid. Roberta's parting remark unsettles Twyla: "Maybe I am different now, Twyla. But you're not. You're the same little state kid who kicked a poor old black lady when she was down on the ground. You kicked a black lady and you have the nerve to call me a bigot."

Twyla replies, "Maggie wasn't black." Either she does not remember that she was black, or she had never classified her sandy skin as black. Twyla decides to join the counter-picketing across the street from Roberta, where she spends a few days hoisting signs that respond directly to Roberta's sign. Twyla realizes that her signs didn't make any sense to an objective observer but she used them to rebut Roberta's take on the protest.

Fifth encounter
Twyla and Roberta meet again, this time in a diner on Christmas Eve, years later, likely in the early 1980s. Roberta wants to discuss what she last said about Maggie. The conversation is sympathetic but ends on an unresolved note. They both end up admitting how neither of their mothers had ever recovered from their respective illnesses.

References

Further reading
Goldstein-Shirley, David. "Race and Response: Toni Morrison's 'Recitatif'", Short Story 5.1 (Spring 1997): 77–86 (journal article)
 ---. "Race/[Gender]: Toni Morrison's 'Recitatif'", Journal of the Short Story in English 27 (Autumn 1996): 83–95 (journal article)
 Rayson, Ann. "Decoding for Race: Toni Morrison's 'Recitatif' and Being White, Teaching Black", in Smith, Larry E. (ed. and intro.), and Rieder, John (ed.), Changing Representations of Minorities East and West, Honolulu, HI: College of Languages, Linguistics and Literature, University of Hawaii, with East-West Center, 1996: 41–46 (book article).
 Smith, Zadie, "The Genius of Toni Morrison’s Only Short Story", The New Yorker, January 23, 2022.

Short stories by Toni Morrison
1983 short stories